Grevillea synapheae, commonly known as catkin grevillea, is species of flowering plant in the family Proteaceae and is endemic to the southwest of Western Australia. It is a prostrate to erect shrub usually with divided leaves with 3 to 7 triangular to more or less linear lobes, and clusters of white to creamy yellow flowers.

Description

This grevillea is closely related to G. trifida, G. muelleri and G. prominens.

Taxonomy
Grevillea synapheae was first formally described by botanist Robert Brown in 1830 in Supplementum primum Prodromi florae Novae Hollandiae from specimens collected in the Swan River Colony by Charles Fraser. The specific epithet (synapheae) refers to similarity of the leaf shape and flower colour to the genus Synaphea.

The names of 5 subspecies are accepted by the Australian Plant Census:
 Grevillea synapheae subsp.
 Grevillea synapheae subsp. latiloba (Meisn.)

Distribution
All 5 subspecies of G. synaphaea occur in the south-west of Western Australia.
 Subspecies A is only known from Mount Misery near Dandaragan in the Geraldton Sandplains bioregion, where it grows in heath.
 Subspecies latiloba grows in woodland or shrubland from near Bindoon to Mogumber in the Jarrah Forest bioregion.
 Subspecies minyulo grows in heath in the Dandaragan-Cataby area in the Geraldton Sandplains and Swan Coastal Plain bioregions.
 Subspecies pachyphylla usually grows in open heath on rocky hills from near Badgingarra to Eneabba in the Avon Wheatbelt, Geraldton Sandplains, Jarrah Forest and Swan Coastal Plain bioregions.
 Subspecies synapheae is moderately common on and to the east of the Darling Range, including from Perth suburbs to as far south as Narrogin and Williams, and as far north as Gingin and Toodyay in the Avon Wheatbelt, Geraldton Sandplains, Jarrah Forest and Swan Coastal Plain bioregions.

Conservation status
Subspecies A, latiloba and minyulo are listed as "Priority One" by the Government of Western Australia Department of Biodiversity, Conservation and Attractions, meaning that they are known from only one or a few locations which are potentially at risk. but subsp. pachyphylla and synapheae are listed as "not threatened".

Use in horticulture
Catkin grevillea is sold commercially and is recommended for use as a low ornamental shrub that is suitable for wide verges, median strips, open locations as well as reserves and parks. When planted is numbers it makes low hedge or barrier or groundcover. It can tolerate drought and a medium frost and soils with a high lime content. It does require well drained soil and part shade to full sun. The plant is a good bird attractor which is used for food and habitat. It can cause skin irritations.

References

synapheae
Endemic flora of Western Australia
Eudicots of Western Australia
Proteales of Australia
Taxa named by Robert Brown (botanist, born 1773)
Plants described in 1830